House of Bodies is a 2013 American horror film directed by  Alex Merkin and written by  Eddie Harris. It stars Terrence Howard, Peter Fonda, George Katt, Alexz Johnson and Queen Latifah. The film was released worldwide on Netflix on April 19, 2013.

Plot
Detective Starks investigates mysterious murders very similar to those committed by the incarcerated serial killer Henry Lee Bishop. As Starks tries to crack through Bishop's creepy demeanor to get answers, a young deaf boy finds himself witness to a college girl fighting to stay alive on a voyeur house website—webcast from the very house where Bishop committed the murders years before.

Cast 
 Terrence Howard as Starks
 Peter Fonda as Henry Lee Bishop 
 George Katt as Raylan Miller / Radar 
 Alexz Johnson as Kelli
 Queen Latifah as Nicole
  Karlee Eldridge  as Ambra
 Juliana Harkavy as Tisha
  Arturo Rossi as  Detective Ramos 
  Harry Zittel  as Kyle

Home media 
The film was released on DVD on June 18, 2014.

Reception 

House of Bodies received mixed reviews from critics.

See also 
 List of horror films

References

External links 
 
 
 
 

2013 films
American horror films
Films set in amusement parks
Films set in 2012
2010s American films